The Men's Mistral One Design was a sailing event on the Sailing at the 2004 Summer Olympics program in Agios Kosmas Olympic Sailing Centre. Eleven races were scheduled and completed with one discard. 34 sailors from 34 nations competed.

Race schedule

Course area and course configuration

Weather conditions

Final results

Daily standings

Further reading

References 

Men's Mistral One Design
Mistral One Design
Men's events at the 2004 Summer Olympics